Pioli is an Italian surname. Notable people with the surname include:

Scott Pioli (born 1965), American football player and executive
Stefano Pioli (born 1965), Italian footballer and manager

See also
Poli (surname)

Italian-language surnames